Suzanne Sablok (born c. 1967) is an Indian model and beauty pageant titleholder who was Miss India the years 1989–1990. She later represented India in the Miss Universe 1990 and became a semifinalist where she placed eighth, effectively ending a 14 year drought for the country at Miss Universe. During the telecast, the co-anchor showed preliminary results indicating that Suzanne had placed second in the preliminary swimsuit competition with a score of 8.15. However, the preliminary scores shown during the Parade of Nations indicate that Suzanne placed sixth in preliminary swimsuit with a score of 8.22, while she placed second in preliminary interview with a score of 8.15. It is unclear which preliminary scores announced were correct.

References

1960s births
Femina Miss India winners
Living people
Miss Universe 1990 contestants